Methylobacterium gnaphalii  is a Gram-negative, motile and non-spore-forming bacteria from the genus of Methylobacterium which has been isolated from leaves from the plant Gnaphalium spicatum in Okayama in Japan.

References

Further reading

External links
Type strain of Methylobacterium gnaphalii at BacDive -  the Bacterial Diversity Metadatabase

Hyphomicrobiales
Bacteria described in 2012